Éole-en-Beauce (literally Éole in Beauce) is a commune in the Eure-et-Loir department of northern France. The municipality was established on 1 January 2016 by merger of the former communes of Viabon, Baignolet, Fains-la-Folie and Germignonville. On 1 January 2019 the former commune of Villeau was merged into Éole-en-Beauce.

See also 
Communes of the Eure-et-Loir department

References 

Communes of Eure-et-Loir